= Anneke Meyer =

British sociologist

Anneke Meyer is a British sociologist. She wrote The Child at Risk (2007) and co-wrote Gender and Popular Culture (2012) with Katie Milestone.
